Jaynagar Lok Sabha constituency is one of the 543 Parliamentary constituencies in India. The constituency centres on Jaynagar in West Bengal. All the seven legislative assembly segments of No. 19 Jaynagar Lok Sabha constituency are in South 24 Parganas district. The seat is reserved for Scheduled Castes.

Legislative Assembly Segments

As per order of the Delimitation Commission in respect of the Delimitation of constituencies in the West Bengal, Jaynagar Lok Sabha constituency is composed of the following legislative assembly segments from 2009:

Members of Parliament

Election Results

General Election 2019

General Election 2014

General Election 2009

|-
! style="background-color:#E9E9E9;text-align:left;" width=225 |Party
! style="background-color:#E9E9E9;text-align:right;" |Seats won
! style="background-color:#E9E9E9;text-align:right;" |Seat change
! style="background-color:#E9E9E9;text-align:right;" |Vote percentage
|-
| style="text-align:left;" |Trinamool Congress
| style="text-align:center;" | 19
| style="text-align:center;" | 18
| style="text-align:center;" | 31.8
|-
| style="text-align:left;" |Indian National Congress
| style="text-align:center;" | 6
| style="text-align:center;" | 0
| style="text-align:center;" | 13.45
|-
| style="text-align:left;" |Socialist Unity Centre of India (Communist)
| style="text-align:center;" | 1
| style="text-align:center;" | 1
| style="text-align:center;" | NA
|-
|-
| style="text-align:left;" |Communist Party of India (Marxist)
| style="text-align:center;" | 9
| style="text-align:center;" | 17
| style="text-align:center;" | 33.1
|-
| style="text-align:left;" |Communist Party of India
| style="text-align:center;" | 2
| style="text-align:center;" | 1
| style="text-align:center;" | 3.6
|-
| style="text-align:left;" |Revolutionary Socialist Party
| style="text-align:center;" | 2
| style="text-align:center;" | 1
| style="text-align:center;" | 3.56
|-
| style="text-align:left;" |Forward bloc
| style="text-align:center;" | 2
| style="text-align:center;" | 1
| style="text-align:center;" | 3.04
|-
| style="text-align:left;" |Bharatiya Janata Party
| style="text-align:center;" | 1
| style="text-align:center;" | 1
| style="text-align:center;" | 6.14
|-
|}

General Elections 1962-2004
Most of the contests were multi-cornered. However, only winners and runners-up are mentioned below:

See also
 Jaynagar
 List of constituencies of the Lok Sabha

References

External links
Jaynagar lok sabha  constituency election 2019 result details

Lok Sabha constituencies in West Bengal
Politics of South 24 Parganas district
Politics of Jaynagar Majilpur